David H. Asay (born August 15, 1925) is an American politician and veterinarian from Worland, Wyoming who served in the Wyoming House of Representatives, representing Washakie County from 1979 to 1983 as a Republican in the 45th and 46th Wyoming Legislatures.

Early life and education
Asay was born in Lovell, Wyoming on August 15, 1925. He attended Meeteetse High School. Asay subsequently attended Colorado State University, graduating with a degree in 1955.

Career
Asay served in the Wyoming House of Representatives from 1979 to 1983, representing Washakie County as a Republican in the 45th and 46th Wyoming Legislatures.

During his time in office, Asay served on the Livestock Board, as well as the following standing committees.
Agriculture, Public Lands and Water Resources (1979–1981)
Education (1981–1983)
Labor, Health and Social Services (1981–1983)
Outside of politics, Asay was also a veterinarian.

Personal life
Asay was married to Charlotte until her death in 2013. He also has five children.

Notes

References

External links
Official page at the Wyoming Legislature

1925 births
Living people
20th-century American politicians
Republican Party members of the Wyoming House of Representatives
Colorado State University alumni
People from Worland, Wyoming
People from Lovell, Wyoming